Jamie Villarreal (born June 23, 1995) is an American professional soccer player who plays as a midfielder.

Career

LA Galaxy 
Born in Inglewood, California, Villarreal started his career at the LA Galaxy academy set-up. While with the U18s Villarreal scored ten goals as he led his team to the Southwest Division championship. In 2014, he signed his first professional contract with the LA Galaxy II, the reserve team of the LA Galaxy, of the USL. He made his debut for the team on June 8, 2014 against the Dayton Dutch Lions. Villarreal came on as a 58th minute substitute for Jack McBean as LA Galaxy II won 5–1.

He made his debut for the senior team on May 21, 2017, coming on as a late substitute for the injured João Pedro in the 87th minute as LA Galaxy beat Minnesota United 2–1.

Sacramento Republic
Villarreal signed with USL side Sacramento Republic FC for the 2018 season on January 4, 2018. Villarreal was released by Sacramento following the 2021 season.

International
Villarreal has represented the United States at the under-20 level.

Personal life 
Villareal was born in the United States and is of Mexican descent. His older brother José (born 1993) is also a professional soccer player.

Career statistics

References

External links 
LA Galaxy Academy Profile

1995 births
Living people
American soccer players
American sportspeople of Mexican descent
Association football midfielders
Homegrown Players (MLS)
LA Galaxy players
LA Galaxy II players
Soccer players from California
Sportspeople from Inglewood, California
USL Championship players